is a Japanese light novel series written by Seiichi Takayama and illustrated by Yukisan. The series is published in English by J-Novel Club. Chany is serializing a manga adaptation on Hobby Japan's website. An anime television series adaptation by EMT Squared aired from July to September 2018.

Plot
Yuuto Suoh is a fourteen-year-old second-year junior high student who is knowledgeable about urban legends. One night, in his quest to discover if the urban legend of the local Tsukimiya Shrine was true, he irreversibly discovered that the legend was not a sham. Forcibly separated from his childhood friend and love of his life, Mitsuki Shimoya, Yuuto appeared in another world with heavy similarities to Norse mythology (while doing research on the world, he discovered that the "other world" wasn't truly another world but was an Earth in the distant past, specifically, 2000-1300 BC, the Late Bronze Age). In his quest for survival, Yuuto inadvertently rose to become the patriarch of the Wolf Clan, the family that had taken him in upon his summoning, by using the modern knowledge provided to him by his smartphone that he had unwittingly brought with him to the other world. Despite winning the affections of multiple Einherjars, magic-wielding warrior maidens, Yuuto has but one goal: to return to the side of his childhood friend and one true love (although this does not stop the other girls from trying to win him over).

Characters

Main characters 

A junior high student turned warlord who accidentally transported himself to Yggdrasil when he took a selfie in front of a divine mirror. In the two years since his arrival, he rose to become the patriarch of the Wolf Clan and used the modern knowledge available to him to come up with new military tactics and new technologies to make his clan powerful. Despite Yuuto himself not having any unique abilities, he is a skilled commander by imitating the tactics of famous conquerors, such as Alexander the Great and Oda Nobunaga, and a skilled leader by studying important texts such as Niccolò Machiavelli's The Prince and Sun Tzu's The Art of War.

One of the Wolf Clan's Einherjars and Yuuto's sworn younger sister. She fights using a whip and her rune allows her to move at superhuman speeds. She also secretly harbors a crush on Yuuto, taking every opportunity to seduce him with her beauty.

One of the Wolf Clan's Einherjars and Yuuto's sworn daughter. She fights using a katana given to her by Yuuto and her rune enhances her strength. She greatly admires Yuuto, desiring his praise and causing her to be very protective of him. This eventually causes her to develop feelings for him.

Supporting characters 

One of the Wolf Clan's Einherjars and Yuuto's sworn daughter. Her rune gives her master-class blacksmith skills. She has a crush on Yuuto and often misinterprets the meaning behind his words as him wanting to have intercourse with her.

The patriarch of the Horn Clan who became Yuuto's sworn younger sister after her clan was conquered by the Wolf Clan. She is a hereditary patriarch, which is illegal in the meritocratic Yggdrasil. Considering herself unworthy to lead, she proposed to marry Yuuto and unify their clans with him as patriarch. Despite her proposal being diplomatic, she eventually develops a genuine affection for him.

One of the princesses of the Claw Clan and the older twin sister of Christina. In contrast to her sister, she is innocent and slow-minded. She is an Einherjar whose rune allows her to move at superhuman speeds and conceal her presence a little, making her an excellent assassin. She became Yuuto's sworn daughter merely because her sister did so as well.

One of the princesses of the Claw Clan and the younger twin sister of Albertina. In contrast to her sister, she is mischievous and intelligent. She is an Eingerjar whose rune allows her to conceal her presence and increase her speed a little, which, along with her information gathering skills, makes her an excellent spy. She became Yuuto's sworn daughter due to her respecting his leadership skills.

Yuuto's childhood friend whom he has a crush on. She is able to call Yuuto using the phone he still possesses while he is close to the divine mirror that summoned him to Yggdrasil. When Yuuto is returned to the 21st century, while she is ecstatic, it doesn't take long for Mitsuki to realize Yuuto wants to go back, so she resolved to go with him. After managing to convince Yuuto that she won't back down on her resolution, she accepts Yuuto's marriage proposal.

A mysterious girl who turn out to be the True heir to the divine emperor of the Holy Ásgarðr Empire, the ruling power of Yggdrasil. Her Real name was 'Sigrdrífa and she bore a striking resemblance to Mitsuki. She is carefree, self-respect, and intelligible about holy magic. Her mood would bold towards Yuuto. After giving Yuuto a good luck kiss in battle She started have notable feelings for him.

Media

Light novel
The light novels are written by Seiichi Takayama and illustrated by Yukisan. Hobby Japan published the first novel in August 2013. Digital publisher J-Novel Club licensed the series for an English release, and published the first four chapters on January 27, 2018.

Manga
A manga adaptation by Chany is serialized on Hobby Japan's website since 2015. J-Novel Club licensed the series for an English release, and published the first Volume on May 31, 2019.

Anime
An anime television series adaptation aired from July 8 to September 23, 2018 on Tokyo MX and BS11. The series was directed by Kōsuke Kobayashi and written by Natsuko Takahashi, with animation by studio EMT Squared. Mariko Ito served as the series' character designer and also as chief animation director alongside Miyako Yatsu. Aya Uchida performed the opening theme song "Bright way", while petit milady performed the ending theme song . The series was simulcast by Crunchyroll, who also co-produced the series. Funimation produced the English dub. Following Sony's acquisition of Crunchyroll, the dub was moved to Crunchyroll. The series ran for 12 episodes.

Notes

References

External links
  
  
  
 

2013 Japanese novels
Anime and manga based on light novels
Crunchyroll anime
EMT Squared
Harem anime and manga
HJ Bunko
Hobby Japan manga
Isekai anime and manga
Isekai novels and light novels
J-Novel Club books
Light novels
Norse mythology in anime and manga
Shōnen manga
Tokyo MX original programming